Balsam Bud Cove is a cove of the island of Newfoundland in the Canadian province of Newfoundland and Labrador. It is located on Green Bay and is a part of the now resettled community of Round Harbour.

References 

Coves of Canada
Geography of Newfoundland and Labrador